The Celebration of the 2,500th Anniversary of the Founding of the Persian Empire (Persian: جشن‌های دوهزار و پانصدمین سال بنیانگذاری شاهنشاهی ایران) was a national event in Iran that consisted of an elaborate set of grand festivities during October 1971 to celebrate the founding of the ancient Achaemenid Empire by Cyrus the Great. The intent of the celebration was to highlight Iran's ancient civilization and history as well as to showcase its contemporary advances under Shah Mohammad Reza Pahlavi. The celebrations highlighted pre-Islamic origins of the country while promoting Cyrus the Great as a national hero.

Some later historians argue that this massive celebration contributed to events that culminated in the 1979 Iranian Revolution, although others argue that the extravagance of the proceedings was exaggerated by revolutionaries motivated to discredit the Shah's regime. As a result, many accounts of the event are said to overstate its cost and luxury.

Planning

 

The planning for the party took a year, according to the 2016 BBC Storyville documentary, Decadence and Downfall: The Shah of Iran's Ultimate Party. The filmmakers interviewed people tasked by the Shah to organize the party. The Cyrus Cylinder served in the official logo as the symbol for the event. With the decision to hold the main event at the ancient city of Persepolis, near Shiraz, the local infrastructure had to be improved, including the Shiraz International Airport and a highway to Persepolis. While the press and supporting staff would be housed in Shiraz, the main festivities were planned for Persepolis. An elaborate tent city was planned to house attendees. The area around Persepolis was cleared of snakes and other vermin. Trees and flowers were planted, and 50,000 song birds were imported from Europe. Other events were scheduled for Pasargadae, the site of the Tomb of Cyrus, as well as Tehran.

Tent City of Persepolis

They referred to the meeting between Francis I of France and Henry VIII of England at the Field of the Cloth of Gold in 1520. Fifty 'tents' (prefabricated luxury apartments with traditional Persian tent-cloth surrounds) were arranged in a star pattern around a central fountain. Numerous trees were planted around them in the desert, to recreate how ancient Persepolis would have looked. Each tent was provided with direct telephone and telex connections for attendees to their respective countries. The entire celebration was televised to the world by way of a satellite connection from the site.

The large 'Tent of Honor' was designed for the reception of the dignitaries. The 'Banqueting Hall' was the largest structure, and measured . The tent site was surrounded by gardens of trees and other plants flown in from France and adjacent to the ruins of Persepolis. Catering services were provided by Maxim's de Paris, which closed its restaurant in Paris for almost two weeks to provide for the glittering celebrations. Legendary hotelier Max Blouet came out of retirement to supervise the banquet. Lanvin designed the uniforms of the Imperial Household. 250 red Mercedes-Benz 600 limousines were used to chauffeur guests from the airport and back. The dinnerware was created using Limoges porcelain and linen by D. Porthault.

Festivities

The festivities were opened on 12 October 1971, when the Shah and the Shahbanu paid homage to Cyrus the Great at his mausoleum at Pasargadae. For the next two days, the Shah and his wife greeted arriving guests, often directly at Shiraz's airport. On 14 October, a grand gala dinner took place in the Banqueting Hall in celebration of the birthday of the Shahbanu. Sixty members of royal families and heads of state were assembled at the single large serpentine table in the Banqueting Hall. They dined off a special dinner service of 10,000 plates commissioned from the English china manufacturer, Spode, each plate decorated in turquoise and gold, with the Shah's coat of arms. The official toast was raised with a Dom Perignon Rosé 1959.

The food and the wine for the celebration were provided by the Parisian restaurant Maxim's. 600 guests dined over five and a half hours, thus making for the longest and most lavish official banquet in modern history as recorded in successive editions of the Guinness Book of World Records. A son et lumière show, the Polytope of Persepolis designed by Iannis Xenakis and accompanied by the specially-commissioned electronic music piece Persepolis, concluded the evening. The next day saw a huge military parade of armies of different Iranian empires covering two and half millennia by 1,724 men of the Iranian armed forces, all in period costume, followed by representatives of the Imperial Armed Forces, with a large military band, manned by military musicians and providing the music for the parade, split into two - the modern band playing in Western instruments and a traditional band wearing uniforms of the bandsmen from different eras of Iranian history. In the evening, a less formal "traditional Persian party" was held in the Banqueting Hall as the concluding event at Persepolis.

On the final day, the Shah inaugurated the Shahyad Tower (later renamed the Azadi Tower after the Iranian Revolution) in Tehran to commemorate the event. The tower was also home to the Museum of Persian History. In it was displayed the Cyrus Cylinder, which the Shah promoted as "the first human rights charter in history". The cylinder was also the official symbol of the celebrations, and the Shah's first speech at Cyrus' tomb praised the freedom that it had proclaimed, two and a half millennia previously. The festivities were concluded with the Shah paying homage to his father, Reza Shah Pahlavi, at his mausoleum.

The event brought together the rulers of two of the three oldest extant monarchies, the Shah and Emperor Haile Selassie I of Ethiopia. Emperor Hirohito of Japan was represented by his youngest brother, Prince Mikasa. By the end of the decade, both the Ethiopian and Iranian monarchies had ceased to exist.

Security
Security was a major concern. Persepolis was a favoured site for the festivities as it was isolated and thus could be tightly guarded, a very important consideration when many of the world's leaders were gathered there. Iran's security services, SAVAK, captured and took into "preventive custody" anyone that it suspected of being a potential threat.

Criticism
The Ministry of the Court placed the cost at $17 million (at that time); Ansari, one of the organizers, puts it at $22 million (at that time). The actual figure is difficult to calculate exactly and is a partisan issue.

According to the BBC documentary, Decadence and Downfall the celebrations cost about 120 million dollars, however, this claim has been described as having no real basis. For example, the documentary suggests supports Shah imported approximately 50,000 birds that died within a few days due to the desert climate, while historian Robert Steele has described this claim as infeasible, and given the October climate in Persepolis, the birds would have been accustomed to the local weather.   The event has been subject to a lot of exaggerated cost estimates in many journalist and historian accounts inaccurately claiming the regime wanted to spend whatever was necessary. However, the Shah only approved the celebration plans after the scope was reduced to one-quarter of the original plan in order to reduce costs.

List of guests

Queen Elizabeth II had been advised not to attend, with security being an issue. The Duke of Edinburgh and Princess Anne represented her instead. Other major leaders who did not attend were Richard Nixon and Georges Pompidou. Nixon had initially planned to attend but later changed his mind and sent Spiro Agnew instead.

Some materials say that the attendee of China was Guo Moruo. According to his daughter, Guo was originally planned to attend, but he fell ill on the way arriving and then-Chinese Ambassador to Pakistan Zhang Tong attended instead.

Some of the guests who were invited include:

Royalty and viceroys

Presidents, Prime Ministers and others

Film
Iran's National Film Board produced a documentary of the celebrations, titled  in Persian and Flames of Persia in English. Farrokh Golestan directed, and Orson Welles who had said of the event "This was no party of the year, it was the celebration of 25 centuries!" agreed to narrate the English text, written by Macdonald Hastings, in return for the Shah's brother-in-law funding Welles' own film, The Other Side of the Wind. The film was aimed at a Western audience. Despite a requirement to show the film in 60 cinemas in Tehran, its "overheated rhetoric" and popular resentment at the extravagance of the event meant it did poorly at the domestic box office.

Legacy

Persepolis remains a major tourist attraction in Iran.  In 2005, reports suggested that the Islamic regime of Iran intended to reconstruct the tent city created for the 1971 celebration. In 2005, it was visited by nearly 35,000 people during the Iranian new year holiday.

The tent city remained operating until 1979 for private and government rent, when it was looted after the Iranian Revolution and the departure of the Shah. The iron rods for the tents and roads built for the festival area still remain and are open to the public, but there are no markers making any reference to what they were originally for. The dedicated Shahyad Tower remains as a major landmark in Tehran, although it was renamed Azadi Tower in 1979.

See also
 Iranian Art Museum Garden
 2016 Cyrus the Great Revolt

References

Further reading

External links
 1971 Celebration of the Shah of Persia in Persepolis (ARTE Documentary Film)
 2,500 year celebration of the Persian Empire on Facebook

Anniversaries
Historical events in Iran
1971 in Iran
Historiography of Iran
Mohammad Reza Pahlavi
Achaemenid Empire
Persepolis
Pahlavi Iran
Persia
Persia